The 3d Search Attack Squadron is an inactive United States Air Force unit.  Its last assignment was with the 1st Search Attack Group, based at Langley Field, Virginia.  It was inactivated on 10 April 1944.

History
Tested electronic equipment and trained crews for its use in antisubmarine operations; antisubmarine patrols, Jan until late 1943.

Lineage
 Constituted 2d Search Attack Squadron (Heavy) on 7 December 1942
 Activated on 10 December 1942
 Redesignated: 2d Search Attack Squadron (Heavy) on 22 November 1943
 Disbanded on 10 April 1944.

Assignments
 1st Sea-Search Attack Unit (later Search Attack Group), 10 December 1942 – 10 April 1944.

Stations
 Langley Field, Virginia, 10 December 1942 – 10 April 1944

Aircraft
 B-18 Bolo, 1942–1943
 B-24 Liberator, 1943–1944

References

 Maurer, Maurer (1983). Air Force Combat Units Of World War II. Maxwell AFB, Alabama: Office of Air Force History. .

003
Military units and formations established in 1943